A Strangely Isolated Place is the second studio album by German electronic musician Ulrich Schnauss, released on 9 June 2003 by City Centre Offices. It was released in the United States on 5 October 2004 by Domino Recording Company.

On 13 October 2008, a remastered edition of A Strangely Isolated Place was issued by Independiente. The album was remastered again in 2019 for a new reissue, which was released on 17 April 2020 by Scripted Realities.

Critical reception

Resident Advisor named A Strangely Isolated Place the 37th best album of the 2000s, describing it as "ambient music with enough oomph to keep the club kids happy." In 2016, Pitchfork ranked the record at number 31 on its list of the 50 best shoegaze albums of all time.

Track listing

Personnel
Credits are adapted from the album's liner notes.

 Ulrich Schnauss – production
 Aesthetic Investments – cover design
 Judith Beck – vocals
 Paul Davis – guitar
 Markus Knothe – photography
 Loop-O – mastering

References

External links
 

2003 albums
Domino Recording Company albums
Ulrich Schnauss albums